Bolarque Dam is a concrete gravity dam on the Tagus in Spain, where the river forms the border between the provinces of Cuenca and Guadalajara. About 6 km downstream from the dam is the José Cabrera Nuclear Power Station.

Work on the dam began in 1907. In 1908 more than 1300 workers were employed at the construction site. The dam was officially inaugurated on June 23, 1910 by king Alfonso XIII. It is owned by Unión Fenosa.

Dam
Bolarque Dam is a 36 m tall (height above foundation) and 292 m long gravity dam with a crest altitude of 643 m. The volume of the dam is 160,000 m³. The dam features a spillway over the dam (maximum discharge 1,700 m³/s) and one bottom outlet (maximum discharge 70 m³/s). The initial height of the dam was 24 m; it was raised to 36 m in 1954.

Reservoir
At full reservoir level, the reservoir of the dam has a surface area of 5.1 km² and a total capacity of 30.7 mio. m³; its active capacity is 23 mio. m³.

Power plant

Bolarque I 
The original hydroelectric power plant went operational in 1910. The generated power at that time was evacuated to Madrid. In 1954 the plant was closed and replaced with the actual power plant. It has a nameplate capacity of 28 MW and contains 2 Francis turbine-generators with 14 MW each. The maximum hydraulic head is 42 m. Maximum flow is 85 m³/s.

Bolarque II 

The pumped-storage power plant was built between 1969 and 1974. It went on line in 1973. The plant has a nameplate capacity of 203 (208) MW. According to this source, the nameplate capacity is 208 MW when pumping and 239 MW when generating energy. The power station contains 4 reversible Francis turbine-generators with 52 MW each. The maximum hydraulic head is 269.5 (245) m. Maximum flow is 98.8 (99) m³/s when generating energy and 66 m³/s when pumping. 

Bolarque II is the starting point of the Tagus-Segura Water Transfer. 2 penstocks (length 1.025 m, diameter 3.15 to 3.45 m) link the pumped-storage power plant with the reservoir of Bujeda dam, which is used as an upper reservoir. From Bujeda reservoir water is then transferred to the reservoir of Alarcón dam.

Bolarque III 
In 2010 an additional power plant with a nameplate capacity of 4.2 MW was opened.

See also

 List of power stations in Spain
 List of dams and reservoirs in Spain

External links

References

Dams in Spain
Hydroelectric power stations in Spain
Gravity dams
Dams completed in 1910
Energy infrastructure completed in 1910
1910 establishments in Spain
Buildings and structures in the Province of Cuenca
Buildings and structures in the Province of Guadalajara
Energy in Castilla–La Mancha